The 1917 Illinois Fighting Illini football team was an American football team that represented the University of Illinois during the 1917 college football season.  In their fifth season under head coach Robert Zuppke, the Illini compiled a 5–2–1 record and finished in a tie for fifth place in the Big Ten Conference. This team included Chicago Bears founder and coach, George Halas. End Reynold R. Kraft was the team captain.

Schedule

References

Illinois
Illinois Fighting Illini football seasons
Illinois Fighting Illini football